Dai Xuejiang (born February 1930) is a retired general in the People's Liberation Army of China. He was a delegate to the 8th National People's Congress. He was a member of the Standing Committee of the 8th Chinese People's Political Consultative Conference.

Biography
Dai was born in Jingjiang, Jiangsu, in February 1930. He enlisted in the People's Liberation Army (PLA) in September 1946, and joined the Chinese Communist Party (CCP) in May 1947.

After establishment of the Communist State, in 1952, he fought in the Korean War under Peng Dehuai. He served in the 23rd Army after war. In 1985, he was assigned to the Shenyang Military Region, and eventually becoming its director of the Political Department in August 1988 and deputy political commissar in April 1990. He was appointed political commissar of the Commission for Science, Technology and Industry for National Defense in 1992, serving in the post until his retirement in 1998.

He was promoted to the rank of major general (shaojiang) in 1988, lieutenant general (zhongjiang) in 1990, and general (shangjiang) in 1994.

References

1930 births
Living people
People from Jingjiang
People's Liberation Army generals from Jiangsu
People's Republic of China politicians from Jiangsu
Chinese Communist Party politicians from Jiangsu
Delegates to the 8th National People's Congress
Members of the Standing Committee of the 8th Chinese People's Political Consultative Conference